The Chesterfield Islands (îles Chesterfield in French) are a French archipelago of New Caledonia located in the Coral Sea,  northwest of Grande Terre, the main island of New Caledonia. The archipelago is 120 km long and 70 km broad, made up of 11 uninhabited islets and many reefs. The land area of the islands is less than 10 km2.

During periods of lowered sea level during the Pleistocene ice ages, an island of considerable size (Greater Chesterfield Island) occupied the location of the archipelago.

Bellona Reef, 164 km south-southeast of Chesterfield, is geologically separated from the Chesterfield archipelago but commonly included.

Etymology
The reef complex is named after the whaling ship , commanded by Matthew Bowes Alt, which sailed through the Coral Sea in the 1790s.

Location 
The Chesterfield Islands, sometimes referred to as the Chesterfield Reefs or Chesterfield Group, are the most important of a number of uninhabited coral sand cays. Some are awash and liable to shift with the wind while others are stabilized by the growth of grass, creepers and low trees. The reefs extend from 19˚ to 22˚S between 158–160˚E in the southern Coral Sea halfway between Australia and New Caledonia. The Chesterfield Reefs are now part of the territory of New Caledonia while the islands farther west are part of the Australian Coral Sea Islands Territory.

Chesterfield lagoon, located between 19˚00' and 20˚30' S and 158˚10' and 159˚E covers an area of approximately 3500 km2. The major part of the lagoon is exposed to trade winds and to the southeastern oceanic swell. The lagoon is relatively deep with a mean depth of 51 m. The depth increases from south to north.

Chesterfield Reefs complex consists of the Bellona Reef complex to the south (South, Middle and Northwest Bellona Reef) and the Bampton Reef complex.

Bellona Reefs 

Captain Matthew Boyd of Bellona named the reefs for his ship. He had delivered convicts to New South Wales in 1793 and was on his way to China to pick up a cargo at Canton to take back to Britain for the British East India Company when he passed the reefs in February–March 1793.
 
West Point , 
Olry Reef , on the south an unvegetated sand cay Caye Est Bellona
Middle Bellona Reefs ,
Observatory Cay , 
Booby Reef ,
Northwest Bellona Reef ,
Noel Bank ,
South Bellona Reef or West Point , Approximately 3 m tall sand islet, reported to be non-existent by 1988 (Sailing Directions)

Lieutenant John Lamb, R.N., Commander of the ship Baring, spent three days in the neighborhood of Booby and Bellona Shoals and reefs. Lamb took soundings between nineteen and forty-five fathoms (114–270 ft), and frequently passed shoals, upon which the sea was breaking. Lamb defined the limits of the rocky ground as the parallels of 20°40' and 21°50' and the meridians of 158°15' and 159°30'. He also saw a sandy islet, surrounded by a chain of rocks, at 21°24½′ south and 158°30' east. The ship Minerva measured the water's depth as eight fathoms (48 ft), with the appearance of shallower water to the southwest; this last danger is in a line between the two shoals at about longitude 159°20' east, as described by James Horsburgh.

Observatory Cay (Caye de l'Observatoire) , 800 m long and 2 m high, lies on the Middle Bellona Reefs at the southern end of the Chesterfield Reefs and 180 nm east of Kenn Reef.

Minerva Shoal 

Minerva Shoal,

Chesterfield Reefs 
South Elbow or Loop Islet, 
Anchorage Islets , 
Passage Islet (Bennett Islet), 
Long Island , 
The Chesterfield Reefs is a loose collection of elongated reefs that enclose a deep, semi-sheltered, lagoon. The reefs on the west and northwest are known as the Chesterfield Reefs; those on the east and north being the Bampton Reefs. The Chesterfield Reefs form a structure measuring 120 km in length (northeast to southwest) and 70 km across (east to west).

There are numerous cays occurring amongst the reefs of both the Chesterfield and Bampton Reefs. These include: Loop Islet, Renard Cay, Skeleton Cay, Bennett Island, Passage Islet, Veys Islet, Long Island, the Avon Isles, the Anchorage Islets and Bampton Island.

Long Island , 10 nm NW of Loop Islet, is the largest of the Chesterfield Islands, and is 1400 to 1800 m long but no more than 100 m across and 9 m high. In May 1859 Henry Mangles Denham found Long Island was "a heap of 'foraminifera' densely covered with stunted bush‑trees with leaves as large as cabbage plants, spreading 12 feet (3.7 m) and reaching as high, upon trunks 9 inches (23 cm) diameter... The trees around the margin of this island were leafless, as if from the sea‑fowl." Although wooded in the 1850s, it was stripped during guano extraction in the 1870s and was said to be covered in grass with only two coconut trees and some ruins at the south end early in the 20th century. The vegetation was growing again by 1957 when the remaining ruins were confused with those of a temporary automatic meteorological station established in the same area by the Americans between 1944 and 1948. Terry Walker reported that by 1990 there was a ring of low Tournefortia trees growing around the margin, herbs, grass and shrubs in the interior, and still a few exotic species including coconuts.

South of Long Island and Loop Islet there are three small low islets (Martin, Veys and Passage islets) up to 400 m across followed, after a narrow channel, by Passage or Bennett Island, which is 12 m high and was a whaling station in the first half of the 20th century. Several sand cays lie on the reef southeast of the islet.

Avon Isles 
Avon Isles (Northwest Point) , 
Avon Isles (south)
The two Avon Isles , some 188 m in diameter and 5 m high to the top of the dense vegetation, are situated 21 n.m. north of Long Island. They were seen by Mr. Sumner, Master of the ship Avon, on 18 September 1823, and are described by him as being three-quarters of a mile in circumference, twenty feet high, and the sea between them twenty fathoms deep. At four miles (7 km) northeast by north from them the water was twelve fathoms (72 feet) deep, and at the same time they saw a reef ten or fifteen miles (20–30 km) to the southeast, with deep water between it and the islets. A boat landed on the south-westernmost islet, and found it inhabited only by birds, but clothed with shrubs and wild grapes. By observation, these islands were found to lie in latitude 19 degrees 40 minutes, and longitude 158 degrees 6 minutes. The Avon Isles are described by Denham in 1859 as "densely covered with stunted trees and creeping plants and grass, and... crowded with the like species of birds."

Bampton Reefs 
Bampton Reefs
Bampton Island , 
North Bampton Reef , 
Northeast Bampton Reef ,
Renard Island , 
Skeleton Cay 

Southeast Bampton Reef  Sand Cay  elevation

Loop Islet , which lies 85 nm farther north near the south end of the central islands of Chesterfield Reefs, is a small, flat, bushy islet 3 m high where a permanent automatic weather station was established by the Service Météorologique de Nouméa in October 1968. Terry Walker reported the presence of a grove of Casuarinas in 1990.

Anchorage Islets are a group of islets five nautical miles (9 km) north of Loop Islet. The third from the north, about 400 m long and 12 m high, shelters the best anchorage.

Passage (Bonnet) Island reaches a vegetative height of 12 m

Bampton Island , lies on Bampton Reefs 20 nm NW of Renard Island. It is 180 m long, 110 m across and 5 m high. It had trees when discovered in 1793, but has seldom been visited since then except by castaways.

Important Bird Area
The Bampton and Chesterfield Reef Islands, with their surrounding waters, have been recognised as an Important Bird Area (IBA) by BirdLife International because they support breeding colonies of several species of seabirds, including lesser frigatebirds, red-footed and brown boobies, brown and black noddies, and fairy terns.

History

18th Century
Booby Reef in the center of the eastern chain of reefs and islets comprising Chesterfield Reefs appears to have been discovered first by Lt. Henry Lidgbird Ball in HMS Supply on the way from Sydney to Batavia (modern day Jakarta) in 1790. The reefs to the south were found next by Mathew Boyd in the convict ship Bellona on his way from Sydney to Canton (modern day Guangzhou) in February or March 1793. The following June, William Wright Bampton became embayed for five days at the north end of Chesterfield Reefs in the Indiaman Shah Hormuzeer, together with Mathew Bowes Alt in the whaler Chesterfield. Bampton reported two islets with trees and "a number of birds of different species around the ships, several of them the same kind as at Norfolk Island”.

19th Century
The reefs continued to present a hazard to shipping plying between Australia and Canton or India (where cargo was collected on the way home to Europe). The southern reefs were surveyed by Captain Henry Mangles Denham in the Herald from 1858 to 1860. He made the natural history notes discussed below. The northern reefs were charted by Lieutenant G.E.Richards in HMS Renard in 1878 and the French the following year. Denham's conclusions are engraved on British Admiralty Chart 349:

The area is a wintering ground for numerous Humpback whales and smaller numbers of Sperm whales. During the 19th century the Chesterfield Islands were visited by increasing numbers of whalers during the off season in New Zealand. L. Thiercelin reported that in July 1863 the islets only had two or three plants, including a bush 3–4 m high, and were frequented by turtles weighing 60 to 100 kg. Many eggs were being taken regularly by several English, two French and one American whaler. On another occasion there were no less than eight American whalers. A collection of birds said to have been made by Surgeon Jourde of the French whaler Général d’Hautpoul on the Brampton Shoals in July 1861 was subsequently brought by Gerard Krefft (1862) to the Australian Museum, but clearly not all the specimens came from there.

On 27 October 1862, the British Government granted an exclusive concession to exploit the guano on Lady Elliot Island, Wreck Reef, Swain Reefs, Raine Island, Bramble Cay, Brampton Shoal, and Pilgrim Island to the Anglo Australian Guano Company organized by the whaler Dr. William Crowther in Hobart, Tasmania. They were apparently most active on Bird Islet (Wreck Reef) and Lady Elliot and Raine Islands (Hutchinson, 1950), losing five ships at Bird Islet between 1861 and 1882 (Crowther 1939). It is not clear that they ever took much guano from the Chesterfield Islands unless it was obtained from Higginson, Desmazures et Cie, discussed below.

When in 1877 Joshua William North also found guano on the Chesterfield Reefs, Alcide Jean Desmazures persuaded Governor Orly of New Caledonia to send the warship La Seudre to annex them. There were estimated to be about 185,000 cu m of guano on Long Island and a few hundred tons elsewhere, and 40% to 62% phosphate (Chevron, 1880), which was extracted between 1879 and 1888 by Higginson, Desmazures et Cie of Nouméa (Godard, nd), leaving Long Island stripped bare for a time (Anon., 1916).

20th and 21st Century
Apparently the islands were then abandoned until Commander Arzur in the French warship Dumont d’Urville surveyed the Chesterfield Reefs and erected a plaque in 1939. In September 1944, American forces installed a temporary automatic meteorological station at the south end of Long Island, which was abandoned again at the end of World War II. 
The first biological survey was made of Long Island by Cohic during four hours ashore on 26 September 1957. It revealed, among other things, a variety of avian parasites including a widespread Ornithodoros tick belonging to a genus carrying arboviruses capable of causing illness in humans. This island and the Anchorage Islets were also visited briefly during a survey of New Caledonian coral reefs in 1960 and 1962.

An aerial magnetic survey was made of the Chesterfield area in 1966, and a seismic survey in 1972, which apparently have not been followed up yet. In November 1968 another automatic meteorological station was installed on Loop Islet where 10 plants were collected by A.E. Ferré. Since then the Centre de Nouméa of the Office de la Recherche Scientifique et Technique Outre Mer has arranged for periodic surveys and others when this installation is serviced.

From 1982 to 1992 Terry Walker carried out methodical surveys of the Coral Sea islets with the intention of producing a seabird atlas. He visited the central islands of the Chesterfield Reefs in December 1990.

An amateur radio DX-pedition (TX3X) was conducted on one of the islands in October 2015.

Known Shipwrecks on the Reef 
Unless otherwise noted, information in this section is from Coral Sea and Northern Great Barrier Reef Shipwrecks.

References

Further reading

Bateson, Charles. Australian shipwrecks Vol. 1 1622–1850, (print), Sydney: Reed.
Borsa, Philippe, Mireille Pandolfi, Serge Andréfouët, and Vincent Bretagnolle. "Breeding Avifauna of the Chesterfield Islands, Coral Sea: Current Population Sizes, Trends, and Threats." Pacific Science vol. 64, Issue 2. pp. 297–314.
Cohic, F. (1959) "Report on a Visit to the Chesterfield Islands, September 1957." Atoll Research Bulletin No. 63 (15 May 1959). http://www.sil.si.edu/digitalcollections/atollresearchbulletin/issues/00063.pdf. Accessed 4-19-2013.
Findlay, A. (1851) A Directory for the Navigation of the Pacific Ocean, (print), London.
Harding, John. THE CORAL SEA...French Territory. (web). https://web.archive.org/web/20081203124528/http://www.thejohnharding.com/archives/00001639.htm. Accessed 4-19-2013. Photograph from Loop Island.
Loney, J. K. (1987) Australian shipwrecks Vol. 4 1901–1986, (print), Portarlington, Victoria: Marine History Publications.
Loney, J. K. (1991) Australian shipwrecks Vol. 5 Update 1986, (print), Portarlington, Victoria: Marine History Publications.

Islands of New Caledonia
Landforms of the Coral Sea
Important Bird Areas of New Caledonia
Seabird colonies